Erythromycin/sulfafurazole (trade name Pediazole) is a combination drug with the antibiotics erythromycin and sulfafurazole (the latter is also known as sulfisoxazole).

It is indicated in acute otitis media in children, particularly when Hemophilus influenzae is the suspected pathogen.

References

Combination drugs
Antibiotics